Invisible Eagle - The History Of Nazi Occultism is a book written by Alan Baker. It was published in 2000 by Virgin Books. Among other subjects the book deals with themes of Hollow Earth theory, Welteislehre, foo fighters, Vril Society and similar speculative theories that were associated with Nazi Germany.

References

2000 non-fiction books
Occultism in Nazism